Lawrence Leo Graner, CSC (April 3, 1901 – April 21, 1982) was Archbishop of the Archdiocese of Dhaka from July 15, 1950 to November 23, 1967. Archbishop Graner was a religious of the Congregation of Holy Cross.

Biography 
Graner was born on April 3, 1901 in Franklin, Venango County, in the U.S. state of Pennsylvania. He was the second son of William Bernard Groner and his wife Martha Emily Coxson.

In 1947, Graner was consecrated a bishop and appointed the Bishop of the Diocese of Dhaka. Three years later It was elevated to Metropolitan Archdiocese by Pope Pius XII and he became its archbishop. In November 1967, he resigned from the post and then he was appointed Titular Archbishop of Vazari-Didda.

He died on April 21, 1982 at Notre Dame in St. Joseph County, in the U.S. state of Indiana.

Reference 

|-

|-

1901 births
1982 deaths
American Roman Catholic missionaries
Roman Catholic archbishops of Dhaka
Congregation of Holy Cross bishops
20th-century Roman Catholic archbishops in Bangladesh
Roman Catholic bishops of Dhaka